The Seattle Kraken are a professional ice hockey team based in Seattle, Washington. They are members of the Pacific Division of the Western Conference of the National Hockey League (NHL). The team was founded as an expansion franchise in 2018, and played their first game during the 2021-22 season. At the end of the 2021-22 season, 38 players, 3 goaltenders and 35 skaters (forwards and defenseman), have played at least one game for Kraken in the regular season.

Key
  Appeared in a Kraken game during the 2022–2023 season.

The "Seasons" column lists the first year of the season of the player's first game and the last year of the season of the player's last game. For example, a player who played one game in the 2021–2022 season would be listed as playing with the team from 2021–2022, regardless of what calendar year the game occurred within.

Statistics complete as of the 2021–2022 NHL season.

Goaltenders

Skaters

References
Seattle Kraken on hockeydb.com

Seattle Kraken

players